The siege of Bonn took place from 3 to 12 November 1673 in Bonn, Germany, during the Franco-Dutch War. Having forced the armies of Louis XIV to retreat, the Dutch in 1673 went on the offensive. At Bonn, a garrison consisting of troops from France and the Electorate of Cologne was besieged by a force from the Dutch Republic (commanded by stadtholder William III), the Holy Roman Empire (commanded by Raimondo Montecuccoli), and Spain. The allied forces captured the garrison following a nine-day siege.

In 1689 Bonn was again the site of a major siege.

Notes

References

 
 
 

Bonn
1673 in Europe
Bonn 1673
Bonn 1673
Bonn 1673
Bonn 1673
History of Bonn
1673 in the Holy Roman Empire
Bonn 1673
Franco-Dutch War
William III of England